"Bad Life" is a single by Public Image Ltd released in 1984. It reached number seventy one on the UK Singles Chart. The song is a re-recorded version of the Commercial Zone track "Mad Max".

Track listing
7" vinyl
"Bad Life" – 3:50
"Question Mark" – 4:14

12" vinyl
"Bad Life" – 5:15
"Question Mark" – 4:14

References

1984 singles
Public Image Ltd songs
Songs written by John Lydon
1984 songs
Virgin Records singles
Songs written by Keith Levene